Interplay, is a solo album by jazz pianist Al Haig recorded in 1976 and released on the short-lived Sea Breeze label.

Reception 

The Allmusic review by Ron Wynn states, "A fine solo piano set from 1976, with Al Haig displaying the total technical package on standards and bop anthems. He plays some rapid-fire; others, he constructs slowly and carefully, then tears them down and rebuilds the theme with nicely executed, intricate solos".

Track listing 
 "In Your Own Sweet Way" (Dave Brubeck) – 4:07
 "Never Let Me Go" (Jay Livingston, Ray Evans) – 3:36
 "Here's That Rainy Day" (Jimmy Van Heusen, Johnny Burke) – 4:38
 "Don't You Know I Care" (Duke Ellington, Mack David) – 6:00
 "Lament" (Ahmad Jamal) – 4:24
 "Joanne" (Al Haig) – 4:27
 "Summertime" (George Gershwin, DuBose Heyward) – 6:00
 "Bess, You Is My Woman" (George Gershwin, Ira Gershwin) – 3:05

Personnel 
Al Haig – piano

References 

Al Haig albums
1976 albums
Solo piano jazz albums